Jebb is a surname. Notable people with this surname include:

Ann Jebb (1735–1812), British activist and writer
Caroline Jebb (1840–1930), American intellectual and socialite
Cindy Jebb, former US Army officer
Cynthia Jebb, Lady Gladwyn (1898–1990), English diarist and socialite
David Jebb, Irish engineer
Eglantyne Louisa Jebb (1845–1925), Irish-born activist 
Eglantyne Jebb (1876–1928), founder of Save the Children
George Robert Jebb (1838–1927), British civil engineer
Geraldine Emma May Jebb (1886–1959), British academic and college principal
Gladwyn Jebb, 1st Baron Gladwyn (1900–1996), British diplomat and politician
Henry Jebb (died 1911), Irish surgeon
Jack Jebb (born 1995), English professional footballer
John Jebb, numerous people including
John Jebb (1736–1786), British religious leader, physician and activist
John Jebb (1775–1833), Irish religious leader and writer
Joshua Jebb (1793–1863), British soldier and government administrator
Katerina Jebb (born 1962), British artist and film-maker
Kathleen Jebb (1879–1957), British artist
Keith Jebb, English poet and critic
Matthew Jebb (born 1958), Irish botanist
Philip Jebb (1927–1995), British architect and politician
Richard Jebb, numerous people including
Sir Richard Jebb, 1st Baronet (1729–1787), English physician
Richard Jebb (barrister) (1766–1834), Irish judge
Richard Claverhouse Jebb (1841–1905), British classical scholar and politician
Richard Jebb (journalist) (1874–1953), English journalist and author
Rob Jebb (born 1975), English fell-runner
Samuel Jebb (c. 1694–1772), English physician and literary scholar
Susan Jebb, British academic